Gaze is a surname. Notable people with the surname include:

Andrew Gaze, Australian basketball player
Christopher Gaze, British voice actor
Gwen Gaze (1915–2010), film actress, daughter of Leslie Gaze
Harold Gaze (1885–1962), children's illustrator, brother of Leslie
Lee Gaze, lead guitarist of the Welsh alternative metal band Lostprophets
Leslie Gaze (1880–1957), Australian singer in operetta
Lindsay Gaze, Australian basketball player and coach
Tony Gaze (1920–2013), Australian World War II flying ace and racing driver
Vera Fedorovna Gaze (1899-1954), Russian astronomer

See also
Bill Gazes, professional poker player
Kristy Gazes, professional poker player